Schneider Triangle is a set of residential buildings designed and built by Thomas Franklin Schneider next to Washington Circle Park in Washington, DC.  The twenty two buildings formed a complete block with a central courtyard.  It was listed on the National Register of Historic Places in 1982, at which time, only 21 of the buildings remained standing.  It forms a triangle due to the street layout of DC.  The Embassy of Tajikistan is located in one of the houses.

References

External links

Residential buildings on the National Register of Historic Places in Washington, D.C.
Queen Anne architecture in Washington, D.C.
Richardsonian Romanesque architecture in Washington, D.C.
Romanesque Revival architecture in Washington, D.C.
Buildings and structures completed in 1889